is a railway station in the town of  Yōrō, Yōrō District, Gifu Prefecture, Japan, operated by the private railway operator Yōrō Railway.

Lines

Station layout
Karasue  Station has one elevated side platform serving a single bi-directional track. The station is unattended.

Adjacent stations

|-
!colspan=5|Yōrō Railway

History
Karasue  Station opened on January 1, 1915. This station was elevated in 1997 for renovation of the Ibi River tributary Makita River and Kuise River.

Passenger statistics
In fiscal 2015, the station was used by an average of 900 passengers daily (boarding passengers only).

Surrounding area
 Ogaki Yōrō High School

See also
 List of Railway Stations in Japan

References

External links

 

Railway stations in Gifu Prefecture
Railway stations in Japan opened in 1915
Stations of Yōrō Railway
Yōrō District, Gifu
Yōrō, Gifu